Tanita: Plasticine Dream is a 2006 Russian adventure game developed by Trickster Games and published by Akella.

The game's soundscape is Colombian folk music.

The game's plot sees the young girl protagonist Tanita land on an island after a plane crash, and her journey to safety.

Absolute Games deemed it the best domestic game in the past few years. Sector criticised the high difficulty while noting it had an element of nostalgia. Stop liked the sweet graphics. AdventureGamers thought it would appeal to fans of The Neverhood.

References 

2006 video games
Adventure games
Video games developed in Russia
Windows games
Windows-only games
Akella games
Single-player video games